World War Z is a third-person shooter video game developed and published by Saber Interactive. It was released for Microsoft Windows, PlayStation 4 and Xbox One on 16 April 2019, and a Nintendo Switch version was released on 2 November 2021. It was also released for Google Stadia on 5 April 2022. Ports for PlayStation 5 and Xbox Series X/S released on 24 January 2023. Loosely based on the 2006 novel of the same name and set in the same universe as the 2013 film adaptation, the game follows groups of four survivors of a zombie apocalypse in the cities of New York, Jerusalem, Moscow, Tokyo, Marseille, Rome and Kamchatka.

Gameplay 
The game is a co-operative third-person shooter in which four players fight against massive hordes of zombies in seven locations, including New York, Jerusalem, Moscow, Tokyo, Marseille, Rome and Kamchatka.

Players can choose from seven classes: the Gunslinger (specializes in range), the Hellraiser (specializes in explosives), the Fixer (engineer), the Medic (healer), the Slasher (specializes in melee), the Exterminator (specializes in crowd control), and the Dronemaster (specializes in offensive/defensive support drones). New perks can be unlocked for each class as players continue progressing in the game.

The game can support up to 1,000 enemies appearing on-screen simultaneously, and they can climb onto each other to reach players on a higher level. Players can collect different items in the battlefield, but their locations are procedurally generated. In addition to fighting zombies, players also need to complete different objectives, such as escorting survivors, in each location.

Each location, or episode as it is known in-game, is divided into 3-5 individual levels. After completing a level, players receive "supplies" based on a resulting defeat or victory. Supplies can be used to upgrade weapons and unlock new attachments. Aforementioned perks can also be bought for specific classes using supplies.

The game features five competitive multiplayer modes. The Player vs Player vs Zombie mode pits two teams of players against each other while the zombie hordes attack both teams. Other modes include Swarm Deathmatch, Swarm Domination, and King of the Hill.

Plot

New York 
A group of survivors fail to reach an evacuation point set up by the U.S. Army and are forced to fight their way back down to the streets. They are soon contacted by another group of survivors, who have procured a subway train that will take them to another evacuation site. The group manage to reach the train and help prepare it for departure while fighting off swarms of zombies trying to overrun them. Although they manage to get the train started, they are stopped by a sealed door that was previously guarded by other survivors who were supposed to open it upon their arrival. After opening the sealed door, the group fights their way to the last Army evacuation site but find all the ships have left and the remaining soldiers and survivors have been killed. Finding a boat attached to a winch, the group desperately try to bring it ashore as their last chance of escape while fighting off a massive zombie horde. After boarding the boat, the survivors leave New York. Somewhere along the way, however, the boat runs out of fuel and the survivors are once again left stranded in a zombie-infested town. They eventually come across another evacuation site still occupied by the Army and full of wounded civilians. With the help of a gunship, the group desperately tries to defend the site under siege from multiple hordes as the soldiers evacuate the civilians. Things take a turn for the better when the Air Force arrives and destroys the remaining hordes, allowing everyone else to escape via helicopters.

Jerusalem 
A group of IDF soldiers and a photo journalist are tasked with rescuing a scientist whom high command regards as crucial in putting an end to the zombie epidemic. The group manages to rescue the scientist, who reveals that he was part of a team developing an experimental orbital particle cannon that can be used to wipe out large swarms of zombies in a single shot. They escort the scientist to the facility where the weapon can be fired and manage to protect him long enough to activate the weapon and escape. While flying away from the facility, the group witnesses the devastating firepower of the cannon, which wipes out a large zombie swarm which overrun the facility.

Moscow 
A group of survivors searching for food and other supplies witnesses the crash of a military helicopter and move in to save anyone who survived. When they reach the crash site, they find only one survivor, a female Russian Army officer, and fight off a massive swarm that attempts to overrun the crash site. After fending off the zombies, the officer enlists the groups' help in activating a deadly nerve agent throughout Moscow that is lethal to both humans and zombies. The plan is to evacuate any survivors in the city and kill all of the zombies, but the nerve agent will leave Moscow uninhabitable for six months. After sending out a signal to warn all survivors to evacuate before the nerve agent is released, the group infiltrate a secret facility where the nerve agent can be released. They successfully release it throughout Moscow, killing all of the zombies in the city. Five days after being stranded in the bunker, the group believes they have been abandoned, but re-establish a connection with the officer who tells them to gas the tunnels to kill off the zombies hiding inside. Soon after, the Russian Army arrives and evacuates the group from the station as it is being attacked by multiple zombie hordes.

Tokyo 
Following the outbreak, the entirety of Japan is being evacuated. A volunteer rescue team finishes a final check for survivors in the city and assists in escorting a bus of survivors to a military checkpoint. The team is then tasked with assisting the JSDF in defending a large cruise ship, the only remaining evacuation transport. The team manage to hold off a massive swarm by destroying a large fuel facility that acts as a wall of fire and manage to reach the cruise ship in time as it departs Japan. However, some infected have gotten aboard due to rushed screening operations, leaving the ship in danger of being overrun as the infection spreads. The team assists the onboard military forces in repelling and ultimately eliminating the infected from the ship. Though they have abandoned their country, the team hold hope that they will one day return to reclaim their land.

Marseille 
With one of the largest zombie hordes in Europe headed straight for Marseille, four members of the French Resistance battle their way through the streets to obtain weapons and medicine before it arrives. They soon learn that a missile battery set up in Fort Niolon across the bay has gone dark, depriving the area of its much needed firepower required to stop the horde. Volunteering to investigate, the group finally arrives at the fort after fighting through a town and a factory. There, they find survivors holed up in a fortified building, and a giant swarm of zombies climbing up the hill towards their position. With no time to lose, the group is forced to commandeer the battery in order to stop the swarm. Using missile launchers to trigger avalanches that halt the swarm, they eventually succeed in lifting the siege, and returns to Marseille upon learning that the city is under attack. Rallying at Fort Saint-Jean, the group stages a final stand against the horde as night approaches, setting up fire moats and sealing breaches along the way. Overwhelmed and outnumbered, they struggle to contact Fort Niolon as their radios are disabled in the attack. They eventually signal the battery with a flare gun, who respond with a missile barrage that obliterates much of the horde, thereby saving the city.

Development 
Approximately 100 people of Saber Interactive worked on the game. The studio decided to use the World War Z license for the game as they felt that there were too many risks involved in marketing a brand new intellectual property. Matt Karch, CEO of Saber Interactive, described the game as the combination of both the 2013 film and the 2006 novel. Gerry Lane, the character played by Brad Pitt in the 2013 movie, is not in the game as the team opted to include multiple survivors who have their own stories. The team took inspiration from The Chronicles of Riddick: Escape from Butcher Bay when they were exploring how they could incorporate elements from the film and the book into the game. Left 4 Dead also inspired the developer when they were crafting the game's gameplay.  A proprietary game engine named the Swarm Engine was used to power the game and render the huge zombie hordes.

The game was announced at The Game Awards 2017. The game was released on 19 April 2019 for Microsoft Windows, PlayStation 4 and Xbox One. Focus Home Interactive and Mad Dog Games served as the title's distributor. It was also an Epic Games Store exclusive. Saber planned to support the game by introducing more episodes, characters, settings, and competitive game modes, after the game's launch.

A Game of the Year Edition of the game was released on 5 May 2020, and includes new weapon and character packs, a new three-mission PvE episode set in Marseille, France, as well as all previously released downloadable content. Alongside the reveal of the Game of the Year Edition, a Nintendo Switch port was announced. Matt Karch, the CEO of developer Saber Interactive, called getting the game to run on Nintendo's console "the hardest thing that we have had to do". It was released on 2 November 2021.

An upgraded version of the game titled Aftermath, which includes the Game of the Year Edition and introduces three new locations (Marseille, Rome, and the Kamchatka peninsula in Russia), new characters, a revamped melee system and a first-person mode, was released on 21 September 2021.

Reception 

According to review aggregator Metacritic, the game received "mixed or average reviews" from critics. Game Informer compared it to Left 4 Dead series and praised its shooting mechanics, visuals and story, but criticized its soundtrack and lack of non-vocal player interactions.

It was the best-selling retail game in the UK in its week of release. As of 23 April 2019, more than 1 million units of the game have been sold. It sold almost 2 million copies in the first month after the release. In Japan, the PlayStation 4 version of World War Z sold 27,872 copies within its first week of release in September 2019, placing it at number seven on the all format video game sales chart.

As of October 2019, more than 3 million units have been sold.

References 
Notes

References

External links 

2019 video games
Cooperative video games
Focus Entertainment games
2010s horror video games
Nintendo Switch games
PlayStation 4 games
PlayStation 4 Pro enhanced games
Post-apocalyptic video games
Saber Interactive games
Third-person shooters
Video games about viral outbreaks
Video games based on films
Video games based on novels
Video games developed in the United States
Video games set in Argentina
Video games set in Australia
Video games set in Colorado
Video games set in Egypt
Video games set in France
Video games set in Hungary
Video games set in Jerusalem
Video games set in Moscow
Video games set in New York City
Video games set in New Zealand
Video games set in Norway
Video games set in Rome
Video games set in Russia
Video games set in Seoul
Video games set in South Africa
Video games set in Spain
Video games set in Tokyo
Video games set in Vatican City
Windows games
Xbox Cloud Gaming games
Xbox One games
Xbox One X enhanced games
Video games about zombies
Multiplayer and single-player video games
World War Z (franchise)
Video games with cross-platform play
Stadia games